Carme Barbará Geniés (born 3 July 1933), known professionally as Carmen Barbará, is a Spanish comics artist and illustrator. Her most famous character is the reporter , who revolutionized the image of women in Spanish cartoons, breaking from their traditional romantic roles.

Biography
Carme Barbará Geniés was born in Barcelona into a family whose members were very fond of drawing and painting.

At age 14 she began drawing for a publication set up by a schoolmate. Then in the mid-1950s, she went on to publish fairy tales for Ediciones Alberto Geniés, owned by her cousin.

Her next creation was the character of Luisa in the magazine  for Editorial Plaza.

For Editorial Bruguera she drew Sissi and Cuentos Rositas in their women's publications, and Cuentos for girls.

Starting in the 1970s, she focused on illustration. She drew for the  strips Claro de Luna and Romántica i Marilin. It was also for this publisher that she drew, with scripts by Roy Mark (the pseudonym of ), the series Mary Noticias.

Through agencies she worked for the international market: Scotland, France, England, and Sweden.

Mary Noticias

Its title character revolutionized the image of women in cartoons, breaking from their traditional romantic roles. Mary works as a television reporter. Her freedom of movement was of some concern to censors of the day.

The strip began on 21 June 1962 and 484 issues were published.

Style
Barbará's style evolved from the "sappy softness" of the "marvelous comic" to the harder realism of romance comics.

Personal life
Married with two sons, Barbará worked at home for years while taking care of them. She retired at age 65 in 1998.

Work

References

External links
 Carmen Barbará at Lambiek Comiclopedia
 List of works at Tebeosfera 

1933 births
Living people
20th-century Spanish women artists
Artists from Barcelona
Spanish cartoonists
Spanish comics artists
Women artists from Catalonia
Spanish women cartoonists
Spanish women illustrators
Spanish female comics artists